Republican People's Party Youth (also known as CHP Youth) is the youth organization of the Republican People's Party in Turkey. The organization has been a member of International Union of Socialist Youth since 2012 and Young European Socialists since 2011.

They hosted the YES Summer Camp 2013 in Foça, İzmir.

References

External links

Republican People's Party (Turkey)
Youth wings of political parties in Turkey
Youth wings of social democratic parties
Secularism in Turkey
Youth organizations established in 1954
Republicanism in Turkey